Yulia Spiridonova (Russian: Юлия Дмитриевна Спиридонова; born 1986 in Moscow, Soviet Union) is a Russian photographer and contemporary artist. Calvert Journal included her in the list of ten rising stars at the Moscow Biennale for Young Art 2016.

Education 
Yulia Spiridonova earned her humanities degree from Moscow State University and attended the post-graduate program at the Massachusetts College of Art and Design.

Art 
Yulia Spiridonova has participated in a number of exhibitions in Russia, United States, Germany, and the Netherlands. In 2016 her project "Parallel News" was selected for the Moscow International Biennale for Young Art. Her provocative imagery received a mixed critical response in Russia, where one of her artworks, which depicted a gay couple with physical disabilities having sex, was called by critics an 'autoerotic disorder'.

Career 
Yulia Spiridonova works for Esquire in Moscow, Russia. As a contributing photographer she made a series of portraits of notable Russians, including the political artist Petr Pavlensky.

References

External links 
Interview with Spiridonova for Das Kunstmagazin (in German), 2016
Review of Spiridonova's art by DAZED Magazine, 2016
Interview with Spiridonova 2015 (in Russian)

1986 births
Living people
21st-century Russian women artists
Russian photographers
Moscow State University alumni
Massachusetts College of Art and Design alumni
21st-century photographers